Gayniggers from Outer Space is a 1992 Danish English-language science fiction short film, directed by Danish performance artist Morten Lindberg. The film is a parody of the science fiction and blaxploitation genres.

Plot
The film follows a group of intergalactic homosexual black men from the planet Anus, who discover the presence of female creatures on planet Earth. Using rayguns, they proceed to eliminate females one by one from Earth, eliciting gratitude from the previously oppressed male population. Before leaving the planet, they leave behind a "Gay Ambassador" to educate the Earthlings about their new way of life.

Cast
 Coco P. Dalbert as ArmInAss
 Sammy Saloman as Capt. B. Dick
 Gerald F. Hail as D. Ildo
 Gbartokai Dakinah as Sgt. Shaved Balls
 Konrad Fields as Mr. Schwul
 Johnny Conny Tony Thomas as The Gay Ambassador

Reception 
The film has been described as a "queer-interest  B movie in the hyper-transgressive tradition of John Waters", and is said to have appealed to an audience of "nerdy white boys" who liked the concept of blaxploitation. The film was used in a recruiting campaign by the Internet troll group Gay Nigger Association of America in the 2000s.

Cultural references
The film begins in black-and-white and later turns to color, in a way similar to The Wizard of Oz. According to director Morten Lindberg, this was a "dramatic special effect" to illustrate "the world being freed from vicious women".

References

External links

 

 : The movie was featured by the Stockholm Queer Film Festival 2006.
 : Gayniggers from Outer Space disrupt a Harris County, Texas, courthouse.

1992 films
1990s science fiction comedy films
1992 LGBT-related films
1990s parody films
American black-and-white films
Blaxploitation films
Danish comedy films
Danish satirical films
Danish LGBT-related films
Danish science fiction films
Danish short films
1990s English-language films
Films about extraterrestrial life
Films partially in color
LGBT-related science fiction comedy films
LGBT-related satirical films
Gay-related films
1992 short films